Dawsar is a heavily armored personnel carrier developed by King Abdullah Design and Development Bureau.  It is a Tariq main battle tank, or an upgraded version of Centurion.  The Jordanian Army received four of these vehicles in 2014.

The prime role of this vehicle is to support mechanized formation on the battlefield by accompanying main battle tanks. They are less vulnerable to anti-tank weapons than light APCs or IFVs. They may be used as a personnel carrier, ammunition carrier, ambulance and command post vehicle.

Design
During conversion process the turret is removed. The vehicle is widened by 45 cm . Front  and rear hatches are added, plus 4 roof  hatches for observation, firing and emergency exit . The Dawsar can carry 13 soldiers with their gear. KADDB developed variants of the Dawsar such as a 120-mm mortar and ammunition carrier. In 2001 KADDB began producing Temsah Heavy APC. This vehicle is also based on Centurion tank .

Protection
Dawsar heavy APC has a low profile hull. The sides are covered with massive side skirts. Dawsar provides full protection against medium calibere KE ammunition. Its protection is equal to that of a main battle tank. It is better protected than the M-113 currently used by the Jordanian Army.

Weapons
A Dawsar heavy APC armed with remotely controlled station is fitted with a 12.7mm machine gun and a Kornet-E anti-tank missile launcher. Another 7.62mm is on a different mount, operated by vehicle commander.

Engine
Dawsar heavy APC is powered by one Continental AVDS-1790 supercharged diesel engine, developing 900 hp. This engine is used in American main battle tank and in Tariq MBT. It is mated to an Allison automatic transmission. Maximum  range is 200 km.

References

Tracked armoured personnel carriers
Military vehicles introduced in the 2010s